Wednesfield Heath railway station was a station built on the Grand Junction Railway and opened on 4 July 1837 as Wolverhampton (often signposted as Wednesfield Heath for Wolverhampton). It was the first railway station serving the town (now city) of Wolverhampton, and was located around a mile to the east of the city centre within the suburb of Heath Town, on Station Road (also known as Powell Street). It was designated as a First Class station.

The station was closed in 1853, when it was replaced by a more centrally located station on the nearby Stour Valley Line. It reopened two years later, renamed Wednesfield Heath.

The station was closed to passengers by the London and North Western Railway on 1 January 1873. The station remained open for goods traffic until 1965 when it was demolished - leaving only part of the northbound platform extant.  Part of the area is now a nature reserve, called Station Fields.

The lines through the station are in use today as a bypass for Wolverhampton.

See also
 Walsall to Wolverhampton Line

References

 Boynton, John, Rails Around Walsall, (1996), Mid England Books, 
Wolverhampton Railway Gazette
Rail Around Birmingham and the West Midlands: Wednesfield Heath railway station
Evans Family page
Wolverhampton History and Heritage Society: Wednesfield Heath station
A History of Manufacturing in Wolverhampton

Disused railway stations in Wolverhampton
Railway stations in Great Britain opened in 1837
Railway stations in Great Britain closed in 1873
Former London and North Western Railway stations